Plaistow may refer to:

Places

England
 Plaistow, Bromley, south east London
 Plaistow (Bromley ward), see List of electoral wards in Greater London#Bromley
 Plaistow, Derbyshire, in the List of places in Derbyshire
 Plaistow, Newham, east London
 Plaistow (UK Parliament constituency), a parliamentary constituency from 1918 to 1950 within what has since become Newham
 Plaistow tube station, a London Underground station in Newham
 Plaistow, West Sussex, a village and civil parish in Chichester district
 Plaistow (Chichester ward), a former ward of Chichester
 Plaistow Green, Greenstead Green and Halstead Rural, Essex
 Plaistow Green, part of Cranbourne, a village near Windsor, Berkshire

United States
 Plaistow, New Hampshire
 Plaistow Carhouse, a barn in Plaistow, New Hampshire

Other uses
 Jeffrey Sterling, Baron Sterling of Plaistow (born 1934), UK life peer with land in Sussex